Larry T. Cohen (1943-2016) was an American bridge player. Cohen was from Palm Desert, California. He was a pharmacist and a graduate of University of Wisconsin–Madison.

Katz and Cohen 

Cohen and Richard H. Katz won the collegiate bridge championship, then a  event, representing Wisconsin. They continued their partnership and won several major  events together during the next decade. Playing under ACBL auspices in Houston during January 1977, they were on the verge of advancing to represent North American in the Bermuda Bowl when officials accused them of cheating. They quit the final match after 96 of 128 s (which forced their three teammates to forfeit) and soon withdrew from the league, but subsequently sued the American Contract Bridge League for $44 million. 
The case was settled out of court with Katz and Cohen agreeing not to play with each other for the next two years.

Bridge accomplishments

Wins

 North American Bridge Championships (10)
 Wernher Open Pairs (1) 1976 
 Blue Ribbon Pairs (1) 1968 
 Nail Life Master Open Pairs (1) 1988 
 Grand National Teams (1) 1974 
 Vanderbilt (2) 1975, 1976 
 Keohane North American Swiss Teams (1) 2001 
 Reisinger (1) 1973 
 Spingold (2) 1973, 1976

Runners-up

 North American Bridge Championships
 Blue Ribbon Pairs (1) 1969 
 Vanderbilt (2) 1973, 1989 
 Keohane North American Swiss Teams (2) 1992, 2003 
 Mitchell Board-a-Match Teams (1) 1971

See also
Cheating in bridge

References

1943 births
American contract bridge players
People from Palm Desert, California
University of Wisconsin–Madison alumni
Date of birth missing
Place of birth missing
2016 deaths